Katrina Hanse-Himarwa (born 22 January 1967, in Hoachanas) is a Namibian politician. A member of the SWAPO party, she served as Minister of Education, Arts and Culture from 21 March 2015 to 9 July 2019.

Hanse-Himarwa is a teacher by profession. She holds a Basic Education Teacher's Diploma (BETD) obtained in 1995 and a Bachelor in Education Management Technology obtained in 1999. She has been working as teacher and school principal since 1987. After winning the Mariental Rural constituency in the 2004 local elections for the SWAPO party she was appointed governor of Hardap Region, a position she held until 2015.

Corruption allegations & conviction
In July 2019 Hanse-Himarwa was found guilty of corruption and lying under oath. Judge Christie Liebenberg at the Windhoek High Court found that she used her office for self-gratification while she served as governor of Hardap Region to remove listed names on a national housing project in order to favour one of her relatives. She was represented by lawyer Sisa Namandje who was not present during the delivery of the verdict.

A day after the verdict on 9 July 2019, Hanse-Himarwa resigned from her position as minister of education. Martin Andjaba succeeded her in an acting position because the next parliamentary election was only months away. Hanse-Himarwa was sentenced to a fine of N$50 000 on 31 July 2019 at the Windhoek High Court, becoming the third high-ranking member of the SWAPO Party since Tobie Aupindi and Marina Kandumbu to be sentenced. She retained her seat in parliament.

Recognition
Hanse-Himarwa was conferred the Most Distinguished Order of Namibia: First Class on Heroes' Day 2014.

References

1967 births
Living people
Members of the National Assembly (Namibia)
People from Hardap Region
SWAPO politicians
Namibian educators
21st-century Namibian women politicians
21st-century Namibian politicians
Education ministers of Namibia
Culture ministers of Namibia
Women government ministers of Namibia
Women members of the National Assembly (Namibia)
Politicians convicted of corruption